Trygetus is a genus of spiders in the family Zodariidae. It was first described in 1882 by Simon. , it contains 7 species.

Species
Trygetus comprises the following species:
Trygetus berlandi Denis, 1952
Trygetus gromovi Marusik, 2011
Trygetus jacksoni Marusik & Guseinov, 2003
Trygetus nitidissimus Simon, 1882
Trygetus rectus Jocqué, 2011
Trygetus riyadhensis Ono & Jocqué, 1986
Trygetus sexoculatus (O. Pickard-Cambridge, 1872)

References

Zodariidae
Araneomorphae genera
Spiders of Asia
Spiders of Africa